Hanik Alphonse Milligan (born November 3, 1979) is a former American football safety who played in the National Football League (NFL) for five seasons.  He played college football at Houston.  He was drafted by the San Diego Chargers in the sixth round of the 2003 NFL Draft.  In 2005, Milligan earned a Pro Bowl selection for his work on special teams with the Chargers.

Early years
Milligan attended Coconut Creek High School in Coconut Creek, Florida and was a letterman in football. He was named the football team's Defensive MVP and selected for All-County. Milligan graduated from Coconut Creek High School in 1997.

College career
Milligan's college career started at Garden City Community College in 1998 where he redshirted in his freshman year. Milligan left Garden City for Iowa Central Community College in 1999 and where he posted 128 tackles, 21.5 sacks (a school record), and six blocked kicks during his tenure. Finally, Milligan went to the University of Houston where he was a two-time All-Conference USA selection and left the school as the third all-time leading tackler with 408 career stops.

Professional career
Milligan was drafted in the sixth-round (pick 188 overall) by the San Diego Chargers in 2003. Milligan missed his rookie season due to a pectoral injury he suffered in pre-season. Milligan bounced back the next year and recorded 19 tackles (16 solo) on special teams. He was named to the 2006 Pro Bowl, for his play the next season but despite this, San Diego released him at the season's end. The Arizona Cardinals picked him up the next day, but released him on August 27, 2007, at the end of the 2007 preseason.

Milligan was considered one of the best special teams players in the league. His dominant play on special teams has earned him the nickname "Burdman".

NFL statistics

Key
 GP: games played
 COMB: combined tackles
 TOTAL: total tackles
 AST: assisted tackles
 SACK: sacks
 FF: forced fumbles
 FR: fumble recoveries
 FR YDS: fumble return yards 
 INT: interceptions
 IR YDS: interception return yards
 AVG IR: average interception return
 LNG: longest interception return
 TD: interceptions returned for touchdown
 PD: passes defensed

Personal life
He is the younger brother of former Arena Football League player Hamin Milligan.

References

External links

https://instagram.com/official_burdman31

https://m.facebook.com/hanik.milligan?ref=bookmarks

https://m.facebook.com/officialhanikmilligan/?ref=bookmarks

Houston Cougars bio
San Diego Chargers bio
St. Louis Rams bio

1979 births
Living people
People from Saint Croix, U.S. Virgin Islands
United States Virgin Islands players of American football
American Conference Pro Bowl players
American football safeties
Arizona Cardinals players
Houston Cougars football players
San Diego Chargers players
St. Louis Rams players
Garden City Broncbusters football players
Iowa Central Tritons football players